Sadi Carnot may refer to:

Nicolas Léonard Sadi Carnot (1796–1832), French physicist, the father of thermodynamics 
Marie François Sadi Carnot (1837–1894), president of the third French Republic, and nephew of Nicolas Léonard Sadi Carnot